Edward Everett Baker (born May 29, 1948) is a former American football quarterback in the National Football League. He attended West Essex High School.

Baker played in one career game for the Houston Oilers in 1972 against the Cincinnati Bengals, which was a disappointment when he threw four interceptions and got sacked twice. He was also a member of the New York Giants and New York Jets, and spent the 1973 offseason with the Oakland Raiders.

References

External links
NFL.com player page

1948 births
Living people
Sportspeople from East Orange, New Jersey
American football quarterbacks
Lafayette Leopards football players
New York Giants players
Houston Oilers players
Oakland Raiders players
New York Jets players
West Essex High School alumni